The 1908 Virginia Orange and Blue football team represented the University of Virginia as an independent during the 1908 college football season. Led by Merritt Cooke Jr. in his first and only season as head coach, the Orange and Blue compiled a record of 7–0–1 and were one of two teams given the mythical title of Southern champion.

Schedule

References

Virginia
Virginia Cavaliers football seasons
College football undefeated seasons
Virginia Orange and Blue football